Jonathan E. Steinberg is a television producer, screenwriter, and director. Along with Josh Schaer and Stephen Chbosky, he co-created the television series Jericho, where he served as writer, producer and executive story editor, Jericho ran on CBS from September 20, 2006, through March 25, 2008.

In 2010 Steinberg developed the television series Human Target, loosely based on the DC Comics series Human Target, for Fox. He served as writer, executive producer and showrunner for the first season, before producer Matt Miller was brought in as showrunner for the second season. Steinberg remained an executive producer.

January 2014 saw the premiere of the TV series Black Sails on the Starz channel, of which Steinberg is co-creator, executive producer and showrunner.

He is currently working on FX's The Old Man and Percy Jackson & the Olympians.

Steinberg is also the brother-in-law of Pennsylvania Governor Josh Shapiro.

Filmography

References

External links

Living people
American television writers
American male television writers
American television producers
Year of birth missing (living people)
Showrunners